Harish Marotiappa Pimple is a member of the 13th Maharashtra Legislative Assembly. He represents the Murtizapur Assembly Constituency. He belongs to the Bharatiya Janata Party.

References

Maharashtra MLAs 2014–2019
Living people
Bharatiya Janata Party politicians from Maharashtra
People from Akola district
Marathi politicians
1964 births
Maharashtra MLAs 2019–2024